United Australia Party may refer to:

 United Australia Party, the major conservative party in Australia from 1931 to 1945.
 United Australia Party (2013), an extant political party led by Clive Palmer.
 Pauline's United Australia Party, a defunct political party led by Pauline Hanson.
 United Australia Party (South Australia), a defunct political party in South Australia.
 United Australia Party – Queensland, the Queensland branch of the United Australia Party.